This is a list of notable mosques in Baku.

References 

 
Mosques